Acrobasis marmorea is a moth of the family Pyralidae. It is found in Europe.

The wingspan is 18–23 mm. The moth flies in one generation from June to August. 
.

The caterpillars feed on hawthorn and blackthorn.

Notes 

The flight season refers to Belgium and the Netherlands. This may vary in other parts of the range.

External links

 Lepidoptera of Belgium
 Trachycera marmorea on UKMoths

Moths described in 1811
Acrobasis
Moths of Europe